Police Dog Story is a 1961 American crime film directed by Edward L. Cahn and starring James Brown and Merry Anders.

Plot
After exhaustive training, a police dog joins an arson investigation.

Cast
 James Brown as Norm Edwards 
 Merry Anders as Terry Dayton
 Barry Kelley as Bert Dana
 Milton Frome as Todd Wellman
 Vinton Hayworth as Commissioner
 Francis De Sales as Capt. Dietrich 
 Brad Trumbull as Bill Frye
 Pat McCaffrie as Keith Early

See also
 List of American films of 1961

References

External links
 
 

1961 films
1960s English-language films
American black-and-white films
American crime films
1961 crime films
Films directed by Edward L. Cahn
Films produced by Edward Small
United Artists films
Police dogs in fiction
1960s American films